An esker, eskar, eschar, or os, sometimes called an asar, osar, or serpent kame, is a long, winding ridge of stratified sand and gravel, examples of which occur in glaciated and formerly glaciated regions of Europe and North America. Eskers are frequently several kilometres long and, because of their uniform shape, look like railway embankments.

Etymology

The term esker is derived from the Irish word eiscir (Old Irish: escir), which means "ridge or elevation, especially one separating two plains or depressed surfaces". The Irish word was and is used particularly to describe long sinuous ridges, which are now known to be deposits of fluvio-glacial material.

The synonym os comes from the Swedish word ås, "ridge".

Geology
Most eskers are argued to have formed within ice-walled tunnels by streams that flowed within and under glaciers. They tended to form around the time of the glacial maximum, when the glacier was slow and sluggish. After the retaining ice walls melted away, stream deposits remained as long winding ridges. 

Eskers may also form above glaciers by accumulation of sediment in supraglacial channels, in crevasses, in linear zones between stagnant blocks, or in narrow embayments at glacier margins. Eskers form near the terminal zone of glaciers, where the ice is not moving as fast and is relatively thin.

Plastic flow and melting of the basal ice determines the size and shape of the subglacial tunnel. This in turn determines the shape, composition and structure of an esker. Eskers may exist as a single channel, or may be part of a branching system with tributary eskers. They are not often found as continuous ridges, but have gaps that separate the winding segments. The ridge crests of eskers are not usually level for very long, and are generally knobby. Eskers may be broad-crested or sharp-crested with steep sides. They can reach hundreds of kilometers in length and are generally  in height.

The path of an esker is governed by its water pressure in relation to the overlying ice. Generally, the pressure of the ice was at such a point that it would allow eskers to run in the direction of glacial flow, but force them into the lowest possible points such as valleys or river beds, which may deviate from the direct path of the glacier. This process is what produces the wide eskers upon which roads and highways can be built. Less pressure, occurring in areas closer to the glacial maximum, can cause ice to melt over the stream flow and create steep-walled, sharply-arched tunnels.

The concentration of rock debris in the ice and the rate at which sediment is delivered to the tunnel by melting and from upstream transport determines the amount of sediment in an esker. The sediment generally consists of coarse-grained, water-laid sand and gravel, although gravelly loam may be found where the rock debris is rich in clay. This sediment is stratified and sorted, and usually consists of pebble/cobble-sized material with occasional boulders. Bedding may be irregular but is almost always present, and cross-bedding is common.

There are various cases where inland dunes have developed next to eskers after deglaciation. These dunes are often found in the leeward side of eskers, if the esker is not oriented parallel to prevailing winds. Examples of dunes developed on eskers can be found in both Swedish and Finnish Lapland.

Lakes may form within depressions in eskers. These lakes can lack surface outflows and inflows and have drastic fluctuations over time.

Life on eskers
Eskers are critical to the ecology of Northern Canada. Several plants that grow on eskers, including bear root and cranberries, are important food for bears and migrating waterfowl; animals from grizzly bears to tundra wolves to ground squirrels can burrow into the eskers to survive the long winters.

Examples of eskers

Europe
Pispala's Pyynikki Esker in Tampere, Finland is on an esker between two lakes carved by glaciers. A similar site is Punkaharju in Finnish Lakeland.

The village of Kemnay in Aberdeenshire, Scotland has a  esker locally called the Kemb Hills.

North America
Great Esker Park runs along the Back River in Weymouth, Massachusetts and is home to the highest esker in North America.

There are over 1,000 eskers in the state of Michigan, primarily in the south-central Lower Peninsula. The longest esker in Michigan is the  Mason Esker, which stretches south-southeast from DeWitt through Lansing and Holt, before ending near Mason.

Uvayuq or Mount Pelly, in Ovayok Territorial Park, the Kitikmeot Region, Nunavut is an esker.

Roads are sometimes built along eskers to save expense. Examples include the Denali Highway in Alaska, the Trans-Taiga Road in Quebec, and the "Airline" segment of Maine State Route 9 between Bangor and Calais. There are numerous long eskers in the Adirondack State Park in upstate New York.

See also

References

Further reading

External links

 Oblique aerial photo of an esker in Waterford, Maine
 Esker Riada Webpage
 Diagram illustrating (i) tunnel in glacier before retreat of ice, forming (ii) meandering esker in  The Ice Melts: Deposition,  p. 6 of "Pennsylvania and the Ice Age" published 1999 by PA DCNR Bureau of Topographic and Geologic Survey
 The Bridgenorth Esker: geomorphology and sedimentology